Beyond the Ice Palace is a 1988 platform game published by Elite Systems for the Amiga, Amstrad CPC, Atari ST, Commodore 64, and ZX Spectrum.

Gameplay 
The game is a 2D scrolling platformer. The player must complete his mission by fighting through three levels of monsters. There are some similarities to Ghosts 'n Goblins, such as the ability to pick up different weapons. The player also has two Spirits of the Forest (circular faces) which may be summoned to attack enemies in difficult battles. More spirits may be collected along the way.

Plot 
A mystical land is caught up in a battle between good and evil, as dark spirits sent by an evil witch are destroying the forests. In desperation, the ancient and wise spirits of the woods shoot a sacred arrow into the air. Whoever finds it will be able to defeat the powers of darkness and destroy the witch.

Reception 
Sinclair User described Beyond the Ice Palace as "not a classic in any sense, but certainly good enough to occupy you until the NBT (Next Big Thing) comes along." According to Your Sinclair, it was "all in all a rather super little game." Crash gave this "slick, playable and extremely compelling arcade adventure" a review score of 83%.

In a retrospective review of the Amstrad version for Retro Gamer, Gavin Eke noted the game's similarly to Ghosts 'n Goblins.  Eke was impressed by the "colourful & smooth" graphics and considered the game to be worth a look for fans of its inspiration.  It was said to be a "flattering tribute".  Gavin Miller reviewed the Atari ST release for the same publication.  He said that although short, consisting of only 3 levels, it did offer a challenge.  Miller concluded: "Overall a great little game with some good music. Would have liked a few more levels though."

References

External links 

Beyond the Ice Palace at Lemon 64
Beyond the Ice Palace at Lemon Amiga
Beyond the Ice Palace at Atari Mania

1988 video games
Amstrad CPC games
Amiga games
Atari ST games
Commodore 64 games
Platform games
Single-player video games
Video games scored by David Whittaker
Video games developed in the United Kingdom
Video games about witchcraft
ZX Spectrum games